Ismaël Chester Diallo (born 29 January 1997) is an Ivorian professional footballer who plays as a defender for  club Ajaccio.

Honours
Ivory Coast U23
Africa U-23 Cup of Nations: runner-up 2019

References

1997 births
Living people
Ivorian footballers
Association football defenders
Footballers at the 2020 Summer Olympics
Olympic footballers of Ivory Coast
SC Bastia players
AC Ajaccio players
Ligue 1 players
Ligue 2 players
Ivorian expatriate footballers
Ivorian expatriate sportspeople in France
Expatriate footballers in France